Melvin Eugene "Tony" Bettenhausen (September 12, 1916 – May 12, 1961) was an American racing driver, who won the National Championship in 1951 and 1958.

Bettenhausen was nicknamed the "Tinley Park Express" in honor of his hometown. He was nicknamed "Tunney" after heavyweight boxing champion Gene Tunney. "Tunney" later became "Tony."

Bettenhausen was part of the midget car "Chicago Gang" with Emil Andres, Cowboy O'Rourke, Paul Russo, Jimmy Snyder, and Wally Zale. They toured tracks in the Midwest and East Coast of the United States.

Racing career

Midget cars
Bettenhausen won the track championship at the Milwaukee Mile in 1942, 1946, and 1947. He was the Chicago Raceway Park champion in 1941, 1942, and 1947.

In October 1950, he was involved in a race in Sacramento, California, when his car locked wheels with another racer's car, causing a crash through the guard rail, resulting in fatal injuries to spectator Peter Bernard Stuberak, and injuries to two other spectators.

He won the 1959 Turkey Night Grand Prix, and the Hut Hundred in 1955 and 1956.

Indy cars
He drove in the AAA and USAC Championship Car series, racing in the 1941 and 1946-1961 seasons with 121 starts, including 14 in the Indianapolis 500.  He finished in the top ten 74 times, with 21 victories.

He won the National Championship in 1951 after recording eight victories and two second-place finishes in fourteen events. He announced his retirement from all racing but the Indianapolis 500 after the season.
He decided to return full-time for the 1954 season. He was involved in a midget car wreck in Chicago, suffering head injuries after striking a concrete wall. He was in critical condition for several days.

He prearranged to co-drive with Chicago Gang friend Paul Russo in the 1955 Indianapolis 500. They finished second.

In 1958 he became the first driver to win the national championship without a win. He was assured the title with a second-place finish at Phoenix. He finished second in the national championship to Rodger Ward in 1959.

Death
Bettenhausen was killed in a May 12, 1961 crash at Indianapolis while testing a Stearly Motor Freight Special vehicle for Paul Russo. The car smashed into the outside wall of the track and then rolled 325 feet along the barrier. The car came to rest in a grassy plot between the wall and Grandstand A, with the tail of the car on fire. Results showed the accident was caused by an anchor bolt which fell off the front radius rod support, allowing the front axle to twist and misalign the front wheels when the brakes were applied, which drove the car into the wall. Bettenhausen died instantly.

Complete AAA/USAC Championship Car results

Indianapolis 500 results

Complete Formula One World Championship results
(key) (Races in italics indicate fastest lap)

 † Indicates shared drive with Joie Chitwood after retiring his own car.
 * Indicates shared drive with Chuck Stevenson and Gene Hartley.
 ‡ Indicates shared drive with Duane Carter, Marshall Teague and Jimmy Jackson after retiring his own car.
 џ Indicates shared drive with Paul Russo.

Racing family
Bettenhausen was the father of Gary Bettenhausen, Tony Bettenhausen Jr. and Merle Bettenhausen. Gary Bettenhausen and Tony Bettenhausen Jr. both raced in the Indianapolis 500 numerous times. Merle Bettenhausen is his sole surviving son as of 2021.

Awards
He was inducted in the National Midget Auto Racing Hall of Fame in 1985.
He was inducted in the International Motorsports Hall of Fame in 1991.
He was inducted in the Motorsports Hall of Fame of America in 1997.

References

External links
The Greatest 33

1916 births
1961 deaths
Champ Car champions
Champ Car drivers
Indianapolis 500 drivers
International Motorsports Hall of Fame inductees
People from Tinley Park, Illinois
Racing drivers from Illinois
Racing drivers who died while racing
Sports deaths in Indiana
AAA Championship Car drivers
World Sportscar Championship drivers
Bettenhausen family
USAC Stock Car drivers
Carrera Panamericana drivers